Ralph Peterson may refer to:

 Ralph Peterson Jr. (1962–2021), American jazz drummer and bandleader
 Ralph Peterson (writer) (1921–1996), Australian writer, actor and producer